Metacnemis valida (blue riverjack) is a species of damselfly in the family Platycnemididae. It is endemic to South Africa.  Its natural habitat is rivers. It is threatened by habitat loss.

Gallery

References

External links
 Illustration (watercolour) by Sélys

Platycnemididae
Insects of South Africa
Endangered biota of Africa
Insects described in 1863
Taxonomy articles created by Polbot